Manganese(VII) oxide (manganese heptoxide) is an inorganic compound with the formula Mn2O7. This volatile liquid is highly reactive. It is a dangerous oxidizer and was first described in 1860. It is the acid anhydride of permanganic acid.

Properties 
The crystalline form of this chemical compound is dark green. The liquid is green by reflected light and red by transmitted light. It is soluble in carbon tetrachloride, and decomposes when in contact with water.

Structure
Its solubility properties indicate a nonpolar molecular species, which is confirmed by its structure. The molecules consist of a pair of tetrahedra that share a common vertex. The vertices are occupied by oxygen atoms and at the centers of the tetrahedra are the Mn(VII) centers. The connectivity is indicated by the formula O3Mn−O−MnO3. The terminal Mn−O distances are 1.585 Å and the bridging oxygen is 1.77 Å distant from the two Mn atoms. The Mn−O−Mn angle is 120.7°.

Pyrosulfate, pyrophosphate, and dichromate adopt structures similar to that of Mn2O7. Probably the most similar main group species is Cl2O7. Focusing on comparisons within the transition metal series, Tc2O7 and Mn2O7 are structurally similar but the Tc−O−Tc angle is 180°. Solid Re2O7 is not molecular but consists of crosslinked Re centers with both tetrahedral and octahedral sites; in the vapour phase it is molecular with a similar structure to Tc2O7.

Synthesis and reactions 
Mn2O7 arises as a dark green oil by the addition of concentrated H2SO4 to KMnO4. The reaction initially produces permanganic acid, HMnO4 (structurally, HOMnO3), which is dehydrated by cold sulfuric acid to form its anhydride, Mn2O7.
2 KMnO4 + 2 H2SO4 → Mn2O7 + H2O + 2 KHSO4

Mn2O7 can react further with sulfuric acid to give the remarkable manganyl(VII) cation , which is isoelectronic with CrO3

Mn2O7 + 2 H2SO4 → 2  + H2O

Mn2O7 decomposes near room temperature, explosively so above 55 °C. The explosion can be initiated by striking the sample or by its exposure to oxidizable organic compounds. The products are MnO2 and O2. Ozone is also produced, giving a strong smell to the substance. The ozone can spontaneously ignite a piece of paper impregnated with an alcohol solution.

Manganese heptoxide reacts with hydrogen peroxide in presence of sulfuric acid, liberating oxygen and ozone:

 2 Mn2O7 + 2 H2O2 + 4 H2SO4 → 4 MnSO4 + 6 H2O + 2 O3 + 3 O2

References 

Explosive chemicals
Manganese(VII) compounds
Acid anhydrides
Acidic oxides